Antonio Eduard Miuțescu (born 28 October 2003) is a Romanian professional footballer who plays as a midfielder for Liga I side FC U Craiova 1948.

Honours
FC U Craiova 1948
Liga II: 2020–21

References

External links
 

2003 births
Living people
Sportspeople from Craiova
Romanian footballers
Association football midfielders
Liga I players
Liga II players
FC U Craiova 1948 players